Saint-Martin-lès-Seyne (literally Saint-Martin near Seyne; Vivaro-Alpine: Sant Martin de Sèina) is a commune in the Alpes-de-Haute-Provence department in southeastern France. With 13 inhabitants (as of 2019), it is the second least populated commune in the department, after Majastres.

Population

See also
Communes of the Alpes-de-Haute-Provence department

References

Communes of Alpes-de-Haute-Provence
Alpes-de-Haute-Provence communes articles needing translation from French Wikipedia